KwaMakhutha is a township in KwaZulu-Natal, South Africa, located south-west of Durban and means "at the Makhutha location".

Geography 
KwaMakhutha is situated approximately 29 km south-west of Durban and forms part of the eThekwini Metropolitan Municipality which is Durban's greater metropolitan area. 

KwaMakhutha is bordered by Ezimbokodweni in the north, Amanzimtoti in the east, Bhekulwandle in the south and Adams Mission in the west.

Infrastructure
KwaMakhutha has a police station, library, a few churches and a masjid. The nearest shopping centres are Galleria Mall and Arbour Crossing in Amanzimtoti, Philani Valley Mall and KwaMuthwa Shopping Centre in Umlazi.

Primary & Secondary Schools
Habiyana Primary School 
KwaMakhutha High School 
Kwathambo Primary School 
Magama School
Sesifikile Primary School 
Umkhumbi High School 
Jaja primary school
Masakhaneni high school
Yiboni Primary School

Higher Educational Facilities
 Coastal KZN TVET College

KwaMakhutha Massacre 
On 21 January 1987, 13 people, mostly women and children, were killed when gunmen opened fire with AK47s on the home of UDF activist and the treasurer and area organiser of the KwaMakhutha Youth League (KYL), Mr. Bheki Ntuli, at KwaMakhutha. Mr Ntuli was not at home at the time. Twenty people, including the former Minister of Defence, General Magnus Malan, and the IFP leader, Mr MZ Khumalo, were acquitted in the Durban Supreme Court in 1996 for their part in an alleged conspiracy between former state structures and the IFP to carry out the attack. Two former IFP members were granted amnesty for their role in Operation Marion, in which the SADF MI's Special Tasks provided paramilitary training and support to the IFP in a joint effort to combat the revolutionary threat posed by the ANC.

Notable People 
 Menzi Ndwandwe

References 

Populated places in eThekwini Metropolitan Municipality